Aiol and Mirabel is an Old French chanson de geste. Originating probably in the late twelfth century, the oldest copy in Old French dates from circa 1280. It was translated into Middle Dutch, Italian, and Spanish. The narrative recounts the adventures of the young knight Aiol who attempts to restore his father's fiefdom, and along the way marries a Saracen princess.

The poem may have been performed in 1212 at the court of Philip II of France, on the occasion of a royal wedding.

Plot
Aiol is a young knight whose father, Elis, lost his lands and his reputation because of the schemes of a traitor named Makaire de Lausanne. He is raised in a forest and has received only a rudimentary education in chivalry. Dressed in the rusty armor of his father, goes to the court of Louis the Pious to restore his father's good name and have his fiefdom returned to him. He is ridiculed at Louis's court in Orleans, but a young woman, Lusiane, recognizes the nobility in him and falls in love with him, not knowing that their mothers were sisters, but Aiol continues his journey.

Subsequent adventures lead him through many parts of Southern Europe. In Pamplona, he rescues the young Saracen woman Mirabel, the daughter of the Muslim king Mibrien, from two abductors, and falls in love with her. The two return to Orleans where Lusiane gives up the thought of marriage after learning Aiol is her cousin. Mirabel is baptized, and she and Aiol are married by the Archbishop of Rheims.

During the wedding festivities in Langres, the traitor Makaire with an army of 30,000 attacks the company, abducting the bride and groom to Lausanne, where he locks them up. Mirabel gives birth to twins, but Makaire takes them away and throws them in the Rhone. Luckily, a nobleman, Thierry, is fishing (at night) and saves the boys and has them baptized; they are named Manesier and Tumas. Afraid of Makaire he takes them to Venice and enters the service of King Gratien.

Meanwhile, Makaire's people are dissatisfied with him and he flees Lausanne in disguise. He takes Aiol and Mirabel and returns them to Mirabel's father, who throws them in jail when they refuse to renounce their Christianity. Aiol is stolen from prison and sold to Gratien, whom he assists in capturing Thessaloniki. The presence of the two adopted children at Gratien's children reminds him of his own, whom he believes dead. Finally, Thierry's wife tells him the truth, and with the help of King Louis Aiol and Gratien liberate Mirabel. All is well that ends well: Mibrien converts to Christianity, Makaire is quartered (like Ganelon), Aiol and Mirabel, and his father Elie, go back to Burgundy; the two sons go to Venice.

Description and versions

The earliest extant version is in Old French, almost 11,000 lines long; and is the sole surviving copy in that language. Metrically, it has two distinctly different parts—the first in decasyllables (divided 6/4, an unusual measure), the second in alexandrines. The manuscript, BnF Français 25516, also contains a version of Elie de Saint Gille, and may be from the library of Margaret of Flanders, Duchess of Brabant; the two are called the "small cycle" of Saint-Gilles. It was written 1275-90 and hails from Picardy, but is based on a version probably written around 1170. A version of the two poems may have been presented in 1212 at the court of Philip II of France, during wedding festivities for Baldwin of Flanders's daughter Joan and Ferdinand, Count of Flanders.

An edition of the poem was first published by Jacques Normand and Gaston Raynaud in France. Shortly after, an edition of the poem, coupled with Elie de Saint-Gilles, was published by Austrian philologist Wendelin Förster in 1876–1882 (and republished, unaltered, by Martin Sändig, Wiesbaden, 1967) An English edition and translation, by Sandra C. Malicote and A. Richard Hartman, was published in 2014. Another critical edition, by Jean-Marie Ardouin (author of a 2010 doctoral thesis on the poem,) was published in 2016.

Other languages
To the poem's popularity speak a number of translations. Two translations into Middle Dutch were made (the "Flemish Aiol" and the "Limburg Aiol"), one more faithful to the Old French original than the other. Both are fragmentary. The Limburg version is the more faithful one, where the Flemish version is a retelling which omits many episodes and cuts it to a third of the original length. The Flemish author frequently cut battle scenes and duels, instead adding or expanding on elements of a religious character.

Two Italian versions remain. The first dates from the end of the 14th century and is a prose romance by Andrea da Barberino; B. Finet-van der Schaaf surmises this is based on a now-lost Italian version. A rhymed version from the early 16th century was printed, twice.

The Spanish romance or epic which relates the adventures of Montesinos resembles Aiol in many ways.

Critical interest
Scholars have noted the multilingualism which is quite prevalent throughout the poem. Catherine M. Jones, grouping Aiol and Mirabel with seven other chansons de geste (including Aliscans and La Prise d'Orange) that have important "polyglot motif[s]", says that the description of Mirabel (she speaks fourteen languages) is characteristic of the trope. Linguistic training is part of the general education she received which "prepare[s] [her and the heroine of La Chanson de Gaufrey] for their eventual encounters with Christian knights".

See also

 12th century in literature
 Doon de Mayence

Editions

References

Further reading

Chansons de geste
Old French texts